SB Niagara is a 79-ton Thames sailing barge, built by  Forrestt at Wivenhoe, Essex, England in 1898 for the London and Rochester Trading Company. She carried cargo on the lower Thames and the English Channel. An auxiliary motor was fitted in 1924.

References

External links

1898 ships
Individual sailing vessels
Ships built in Wivenhoe
Thames sailing barges
Transport on the River Thames
Sailing ships of the United Kingdom